Haploa contigua, the neighbor moth, is a moth of the family Erebidae. It was described by Francis Walker in 1855. It is found in eastern North America, from Quebec to the mountains of Georgia and west to South Dakota, Arkansas and Mississippi.

The wingspan is 36–49 mm. The forewings are cream to whitish with some brown lines. The inner borders of the forewings are edged with brown. Adults are on wing from late May to early August. There is one generation per year.

Larvae have been recorded feeding on the leaves of Corylus americana. The species overwinters in the larval stage.

References

 

Callimorphina
Moths described in 1855